The Orira River is a river  of the Northland Region of New Zealand's North Island. It flows southwest, and for much of its length it is a northwestern arm of the Hokianga Harbour.

See also
List of rivers of New Zealand

References

Hokianga
Rivers of the Northland Region
Rivers of New Zealand